The Campo Pequeno Bullring is the current Praça de Touros of the city of Lisbon, in Portugal. It is located in Avenida da República, in Lisbon.

It is an enclosure for bull races, musical concerts, fairs, exhibitions and other events, with a capacity of around 10.000 people bearing 6.848 seats. The bullfighting agenda usually happens in the Summer and Spring seasons.

Historical background 
In various countries mythological gods can show up with the appearance or elements that refer to the bull. This animal has been seen by various peoples as a symbol of procreation, genetic strength, invincibility, leadership, fertility, abundance, but also with a great destructive capacity. These characteristics can be at the origin of this need to show how they can beat the animal. People who could fight bulls were seen as possessing the same characteristics of bravery, power and strength attributed to the bull. As so, bullfighting has been described to be a form of affirmation within different people and communities. The history of bullfighting comes back to the time where some kings were enthusiasts about this activity by facing the bull in public squares, either on horses or by feet.

In the 16th century, in 1578 the, at the time, King Sebastian of Portugal ordered the erection of the first known bullring in Lisbon, in Xabregas. The other bullrings existing at the time in Lisbon were built in the 18th century in Junqueira, Belém, Anunciada and Salitre. According to documents of the Real Palace of Mafra dated from 1741, the first references to bull’s races in Portugal were in Campo Pequeno’s square. That’s where was built a tiny square made out of wood with a reduced capacity for the public. The current bullring of Campo Pequeno succeeded the one existing in Campo de Santana. This one existed from 1831 until 1888 following an inspection that interdicted the building due to security issues related to the poor conservation status of the building. In the aftermath, on the 19th of February of 1889 the Lisbon Town Hall conceded a piece of land to Casa Pia for the building of a new bull races space in Campo Pequeno. Casa Pia is the institution still responsible for the organisation of bull races in Lisbon. At the time though, due to financial complications, Casa Pia conceded the right of construction and exploration of that space to a private company for 90 years. After those years, the building should then be delivered back to the institution without any charges. The cost of the arena was 161 200$000 réis, paid by a group of Portuguese shareholders, who kept the property rights and the right to organise races for the referred period under the condition of paying Casa Pia an annual rent of 3500$000 réis. The building is classified as a Property of Public Interest, by Decree of the 24th January 1983.

The Public Arena on the 21st Century 

Constructed in visible solid brick from the outside, the Campo Pequeno square would come to be a target of a deep restoration work in the beginning of the 21st century. This square was inaugurated in 1892, with inspiration from Madrid’s bullfight arena and projected in a neo-arabic revivalist architecture. The museum integrates and evokes both the Portuguese bullfight history and national traditions. The bullring had its first ring structurally altered from the original brick arcs to solid brick. The exterior ring stood unaltered on a structural level, only being target of reparations and reinforcements. The most significant change was to the removable cover, that turns the square into a more versatile space, making it possible to use all year for different purposes.

The former Portuguese bullfighter Rui Bento Vasques directs the bullfighting activities since the opening of the square in 2006. There is a commercial gallery in the underground area of the square, today known as the Campo Pequeno shopping centre, as well as some commercial spaces on the ground floor, like bars and restaurants. The financing of the investment turned out to be too heavy for the exploration conditions of this space. In 2014, the debt was over 100 million euros, where 90 million were to the Portuguese Central Bank. The Renovation Society of Campo Pequeno was declared bankrupt in the same year.

In 2019, the businessman Álvaro Covões and the Horizon fund, from Pires de Lima and Sérgio Monteiro, won the selling contest and paid 37 million for the arena. Álvaro Covões is the concerts and shows promoter and Horizon fund is specialised in infrastructure management.

Museum of Campo Pequeno 
The museum of Campo Pequeno reopened in 2015, integrating a part of the old museum’s assets and the Sector 1 bullfighting group. To this collection, other pieces were added, like the donations made by José Samuel Lupi, Francisco Mascarenhas and Joaquim Bastinhas. The space aims to create a memorial space of the Portuguese bullfighting tradition, as well as the publicity of the bullfighting culture in general to the public, valuing the immaterial heritage of it. 

According to Diário de Notícias, since the inauguration and until February of 2016, 11 thousand people from 94 different countries visited the museum. The visitors were mostly Portuguese and French people followed by German, Brazilian, Italian and Spanish visitors. There were also visitors from Iraq, Uganda and New Zealand, aged between 25 and 45 years old.

The Architectural Project 

The Campo Pequeno square was projected with an aim to improve the city of Lisbon, taking advantage of the empty spaces still existing in the 19th century and turning them into cosmopolitan areas. In 1889, the Lisbon’s City Council approved the construction of the square, which would integrate the construction plan of the New Avenues neighbourhood, a project that aimed to expand the city of Lisbon up north. The purpose of these developments was to relieve the pressure of the 200.000 inhabitants that occupied the place up to Passeio Público, the current Restauradores Square.This new area would urbanise and connect different points of the city, with a progressive architectural plan and an eclectic style based on the creation of long avenues. These plans would make the biggest change in the city of Lisbon since the earthquake that devastated the city in 1755.

The choice to make the bullfight ring in this square has historical reasons, since there had been previously a bullfight ring there, more rudimental, constructed in wood and because Campo Pequeno was considered to be a public address.

It is relevant to note that Campo Pequeno was, before urban planning, a very rural space, only with a couple farms, a factory and one building – the Galveias Palace. In the 19th century, Lisbon was smaller and concentrated close to the river, but in 1885 a new city plan was adopted, deciding to expand the city up north, where Campo Pequeno is located. 

Today Campo Pequeno is not just a bullring, it is a city square. It is a gardened place, a shopping centre surrounded by residential buildings, offices, a library, university and banks, which brought to the square a very current Lisbon city life environment. All this environment created around the Campo Pequeno Square, all the light brought up to the surrounding spaces was only possible with the construction of the new avenues and a policy of dynamization always present in Ressano Garcia's thinking.

The Bullfight Ring 

The first project for the bullfight square is inspired by the one in Madrid, with a neo-mudéjar style. It was projected with an architectural arabic style, like the one in Madrid. The Portuguese architect Dias da Silva is one of the main names behind the construction of this square, alongside Henrique Sabino dos Santos and the French contractor Emile Boussard. The construction of the square went according to Dias da Silva’s project, using mainly brick but also metal (mainly on the domes), giving it a more modern and innovative look. The domes also had inspiration in the Byzantine, Russian and Hindo-islamic architecture, having similarities with the St Mark's Basilica in Venice and with the S. Basil’s Cathedral in Moscow.

The cultural and recreational architecture of the space is mostly inspired by the neo-Arab revivalist tendencies. The circular plan spectacle building has several turrets that boost the exterior, creating a counter-curve plan and helping, thus, to strengthen the stirrup arches that support the benches, between which there are dependencies and circulation corridors. It is built of brick, with the roofs in metal domes and topped by decorative stepped battlements.

The spans are either arched or traversed, accentuating the neo-Moorish character. Inside, there is an arena for shows, which is transformed into an arena with a removable roof, and at the base of the arena, a commercial gallery, all of recent execution. It is the most expressive building of the so-called neo-Arab style to be built in Lisbon in the late 19th century. Being a monochromatic building, the movement is given by the rhythm of the forms of the great number of openings in outdated arches and re-entrant frames, inspired by the vanished Plaza de Toros of Madrid (by Emilio Rodriguez Ayuso) which accentuates the Spanish neo-mudéjar revivalism.

It is also important to note that this innovative project aimed to attract investments, by the exceptionality of the architecture as well as to enrich Lisbon and turn it into a more cosmopolitan city. Today, the New Avenues neighbourhood is a very accessible area, with valued houses and a great diversity of commerce, making it one of the most attractive neighbourhoods for Lisbon residents.

Public Spaces in urban life 
Now, linking the contents given during class, we think that it is important to apply them to Praça do Campo Pequeno. Taking into account the various existent public spaces in urban life, we think that Praça do Campo Pequeno could fit into three types of public spaces at the same time.

In one hand, it is a collectively used space because we can notice that different social and cultural groups using this Public square at different times of the day, for example at night time this place has homeless people trying to use public benches to sleep on while during lunch time we can see a specific group of students and business people going there just to have lunch. In the meantime, we can also see a specific group there just to watch the bull races and just to claim their presence there.

On the other hand, Praça do Campo Pequeno can be a common space because it offers different services and so promotes a flexible aggregation in between individuals, meaning that it has a universal access. We perceive it as a common space also because, even though there is a specific time of the day we can see different and specific groups, it is not a rigid thing. We can see diversity and multiculturalism there, an open space for everyone regardless of your social status, ethnic community and beliefs. Thirdly and finally, we consider Praça do Campo Pequeno a collective space because we can see throughout the day different groups practicing sports on the designated place such as playing soccer but also running. It is also a family space, with a playground where you can find children every afternoon after school.

Geotourism 

Geotourism can be defined as a micro-niche of the tourism market focused on the geological diversity  of the destination site, with special attention given to sites of geological interest, the so-called geosites or cultural georesources. It is a touristic activity that tends to attract tourists of greater wealth, because it is practised on a smaller scale, is more flexible and therefore less invasive and more beneficial to local populations.

Any place can have potential for Geotourism, since all places have their own history of geological formation and none is formed in the same way.

We could just think of Lisbon and its seven hills. The urban environment has potential for attracting this type of tourism, as the vast majority of the population lives in urban centres and the heritage value of something that is physically close has more meaning to ordinary people than something that is hundreds of miles away in a remote place with difficult access. The urban dimension creates in people the desire for an escape from daily stress and, as a result, those who live in large population centres tend to travel more, as a way of getting away from it all and release the stress that comes with urban life.

The Lisbon subway is divided into 4 different lines - the Green, Red, Blue and Yellow. The Yellow Line where Campo Pequeno is located could almost be called the Stone line. That's where are located three of the most important stations in terms of richness, diversity and artistic work in natural stone: Campo Pequeno, Saldanha and Entrecampos. Here, art and geological heritage are intertwined and have the power to dazzle visitors with their beauty, richness and techniques of stone work visible in the inlays from Campo Pequeno’s metropolitan station.

The legal framework and political conflicts 
As subjects of law and multiple rights, under the current legal status, animals hold today a different position, which pushes us to redefine the relationship that human beings establish and want to establish with animals. The Universal Declaration on Animal Welfare (UDAW) approved by UNESCO in 1978 establishes, in the 1st article, that “all animals are born with an equal claim on life and the same rights to existence” and that “no animal shall be ill-treated or shall be subject to cruel acts” (point b, article 3). Article 10, though, is the most important one for our problematic as it states that “no animal shall be exploited for the amusement of man” and that all “exhibitions and spectacles involving animals are incompatible with their dignity”.

The commands of UDAW would be enough to put the staging of bullfighting shows in the Portuguese legal systems into crisis. The Portuguese state has adhered to the political orientations of the United Nations in the areas of education, social sciences and culture since it is an instrument of soft law. However, the UDAW does not function as an imperative set of rules in relation to its member states. It is, therefore, impossible to impose legal consequences or sanctions on a state that denies its ethical and political commitment.

Under the provisions of article 8 of the Constitution of the Portuguese Republic the rules and principles of common international law are an integrated part of the Portuguese law. However, Portuguese legislators still have a very anthropocentric and reluctant vision when confronted with the possibility of being compelled to abandon ancient traditions inherited from the past. It then contributes to the persistence of idiosyncrasies which are difficult to solve under the legal status of the country. Bullraces are one of these traditions where there is a collision of different values and that gives rise to political conflicts both in society and in the parliament. 

The Campo Pequeno square has been stage for public demonstrations against and for bullfights even though their dimension and purpose varies. This shows us that the square can also be seen as a relevant space for public discussion and that there is some resistance in the country to this practice which can be a double edged knife. In one hand the square is the place that is most representative of the bullfight tradition in Lisbon and, on the other, it's the place chosen by protestors to riot the defence of animal rights and raise awareness for this issue. Campo Pequeno will remain to be on of the most important stages in the fight towards the abolition of bullfights.

The general idea is that, from the new bylaws of animals, the abolition of bull shows seems now closer than ever.

See also 
 Portuguese-style bullfighting

References

External links

Official site (in Portuguese)
Portuguese Architectural Patrimony Registry profile (in Portuguese)
Google Map Satellite View of the Bull Ring

References 
Sports venues in Lisbon
Campo Pequeno
Sports venues completed in 1892